The Cold War Museum is a history museum in Warrenton, Virginia, focused on Cold War history.

The museum was founded in 1996 by Francis Gary Powers Jr. (son of pilot Francis Gary Powers), and John C. Welch to preserve Cold War history and honor Cold War veterans.

Collection and holdings
The Cold War museum has over $3 million worth of artefacts in its collection. Museum holdings include items from the 1948–1949 Berlin Airlift, the 1960 U-2 incident (including the helmet used by Francis Gary Powers and the suitcase carried by Powers across Glienicke Bridge when he was exchanged for Rudolf Abel), a  display on the Cuban Missile Crisis that includes a Soviet SA-2 missile and four American Nike missiles, and material from the USS Liberty incident, USS Pueblo incident, Corona spy satellites, and the Space Race.

The museum also has the largest collection of civil defence items in America, mainly acquired from the former Civil Defence headquarters in Washington; a yellow East German Trabant automobile, and Soviet and East German flags and banners. The museum has also acquired the mailbox used by Aldrich Ames to contact his Soviet handlers.

Educational activities and publications
The museum has developed various educational programs and activities to help educate future generation about the Cold War. Museum speakers have visited numerous grade schools, high schools, colleges, and universities in order to teach students about the Cold War. The museum also assists with educational programming for the History Channel, the Discovery Channel, A&E Television Networks, the Learning Channel, C-SPAN, and numerous public access stations.

The mobile exhibit on the U-2 Incident, the "Spies of Washington Tour," and the Cold War Conversations lecture series continue to generate interest and support.

The mobile exhibit on the U-2 Incident of May 1, 1960, helps promote the need for a permanent Cold War Museum. The exhibit has been displayed at many museums across the United States and internationally. The traveling exhibit helps to promote The Cold War Museum.

In collaboration with Carol S. Bessette, Certified Master Tour Guide, the Cold War Museum offers the original Spy Tour of Washington. Since its earliest days, Washington, D.C. has been the scene of international intrigue, espionage, and intelligence activity, as the U.S. government has tried to learn the plans of other countries while keeping its own plans secret. Key players in this non-ending drama include personalities as diverse as Rose Greenhow, Herbert Yardley, Major General "Wild Bill" Donovan, Aldrich Ames, and Robert Hanssen. The educational bus tour visits many of the locations in and around Washington that have been associated with intelligence and counter intelligence activities for the past 200 years. Tourists are required to walk between some sites, and there is an opportunity to visit the International Spy Museum for an additional fee.

On October 14, 2006, the museum hosted an international conference to commemorate the 50th Anniversary of the 1956 Hungarian and Polish Crises. Dr. Sergei Khrushchev, the son of Nikita Khrushchev, and David Eisenhower, grandson of President Dwight D. Eisenhower participated with VIPs from Hungary and Poland and well renowned scholars. The Hungarian and Polish Embassies, American Hungarian Federation, Fairfax County Economic Development Authority, the Hungarian Technology Center, the Cold War Museum,  and the South County Secondary School were hosts for the program. Sponsors included EnviroSolutions, Inc., K. Hovnanian Homes, Marriott Fairfax at Fair Oaks, Northern Virginia Community College, Verizon, and Vulcan Materials Company.

On October 2, 2007, Cold War Conversations-II took place to commemorate the 50th Anniversary of the 1957 launch of Sputnik. Dr. Sergei Khrushchev, the son of Nikita Khrushchev and author of Memoirs of Nikita Khrushchev 1953–1964 and Paul Dickson, author of Sputnik—Shock of the Century discussed this important Cold War historical event. Dialog between the two and Q&A from the audience followed their presentations. Washington Dulles Airport Hotel, Northern Virginia Community College – Loudoun Campus, NASA, and the Cold War Museum were event sponsors.

The museum worked with the Embassy of the Czech Republic to commemorate the 40th anniversary of the Prague Spring and with the British Berlin Airlift Association to commemorate the 60th anniversary of the Berlin Airlift.

Periodically, the Cold War Museum hosts book signing lectures for authors who have written on the Cold War. The Cold War Times  is a quarterly online publication produced for the Cold War Museum and Cold War Veterans.

In 1997, Congressman Tom Davis, with the assistance of the Cold War Museum, drafted legislation for the creation of a "Cold War Memorial" that will honor all the men and women who were part of Cold War events and activities.

Lease, status and chapters
The museum signed a lease on December 1, 2009, with the Vint Hill Economic Development Authority for the use of a two-story building and secure storage facility at Vint Hill Farms Station, Virginia, in Fauquier County,  from Washington Dulles International Airport. Vint Hill Farms is a 695-acre former United States Army communications base. The museum opened on November 11, 2011.

The Cold War Museum is a 501(c)(3) tax-exempt charitable organization. As a result, it has pledges of support for loans of artifacts from the Air and Space Museum, the National Museum of American History, the National Portrait Gallery, and the National Postal Museum. The museum is also working with the privately owned International Spy Museum in Washington, Diefenbunker, Canada's Cold War Museum in Ottawa, and the Atombunker Harnekop near Berlin to temporarily display some of its artifacts.

The Cold War Museum has a chapter in the American Midwest based in Waukesha, Wisconsin, and a chapter in Berlin, Germany.

See also 
 Tagansky Protected Command Point - Cold War museum in Moscow, Russia.
 Plokštinė missile base - Cold War museum in Lithuania.
 Wende Museum - Cold War museum in Culver City, California.
 Strategic missile forces museum - Strategic Missile Forces museum with an exhibitions related to a Cold War in Ukraine

References

External links
 
 The Cold War Times - Cold War Museum's quarterly newsletter

Museums established in 1996
1996 establishments in Virginia
Military and war museums in Virginia
Museums in Fauquier County, Virginia
Smithsonian Institution affiliates
Cold War museums in the United States